Mukwonago High School is located in Mukwonago in Waukesha County, Wisconsin, United States.  It is part of the Mukwonago Area School District.  Approximately 1700 students attend the school, which has over 150 staff members.

The original building at 308 Washington Avenue was listed on the National Register of Historic Places on October 7, 1994, but was delisted on May 12, 2009. The current building, erected in the 1970s, is at 605 W. School Road (Hwy NN) in Mukwonago.

The Mukwonago School District serves the villages of Big Bend and Mukwonago, the Town of Mukwonago, parts of the towns of Eagle, East Troy, Genesee, and Ottawa, part of the village of North Prairie, and part of the city of Muskego.

Extracurricular activities
The 2004 Mukwonago Indians football team had an undefeated season ending with a victory over the Marshfield Tigers in the state championship. Other team state championships include girls' swimming (2011, 2012, 2013), girls' cross country (1994), boys' cross country (1964, 1966), boys' track (1964), as well as titles in debate and dance team.

MHS formerly had a competitive show choir, the women's-only "Starstruck", as well as the noncompetitive mixed-gender "Guys and Dolls".

Mascot controversy 
During the 2009-2010 school year, a Mukwonago High School senior filed a complaint with the Wisconsin Department of Public Instruction claiming that the Indians mascot and logo were racially discriminatory against Native Americans. The school fought the accusations, but on October 8, 2010, the department stripped the school of the nickname and logo. It called the mascot "unambiguously race-based". The case was then appealed by the School. The High School won the appeal, allowing it to keep both the name and mascot.

Notable alumni 
 Glenn Robert Davis, U.S. Representative
 Scott Jensen, former Assembly majority leader
 Nick Pearson, Olympian in speed skating, 2002 and 2010 Winter Games
 Brad Schimel, Wisconsin politician and lawyer
 Eric Szmanda, actor
 Mary Beth Iagorashvili, Olympian in the modern pentathlon
 Fred Thomas (third baseman), Former MLB player for the Boston Red Sox
 Nicholas Godejohn, convicted of the murder of Dee Dee Blanchard
 Angie Jakusz, contestant on the TV show Survivor
 Paul Stender, best known for designing, building and driving some of the most extreme and fastest Jet/Turbine Engine powered land vehicles in the world.

References

External links 
Mukwonago High School home page

Public high schools in Wisconsin
Schools in Waukesha County, Wisconsin